Holiday Harmony is the 15th studio album by American folk rock duo America, released by Rhino Records in 2002. Produced by Andrew Gold, it is a Christmas album. The album contains a number of traditional Christmas standards, some of which were recorded with distinct parallels to America's hits. For example, the "la-la-la" refrain in "Winter Wonderland" is strongly reminiscent of "A Horse With No Name," while "White Christmas" uses a guitar strumming style similar to that in "Tin Man." The album contains three new songs: "A Christmas To Remember," "Winter Holidays," and the "Ventura Highway"-themed "Christmas In California". "Winter Wonderland" became a minor hit during the Christmas season in 2002, reaching 26 on the Radio & Records Adult Contemporary chart.

In November 2010, the album was re-released on CD and digital download format as a "Collector's Edition."  This edition contained a bonus track, "A Holly Jolly Christmas," produced by Bobby Woods.

Track listing

References

2002 Christmas albums
America (band) albums
Christmas albums by American artists
Pop rock Christmas albums
Rhino Records albums